The Brussels Cycling Classic (known until June 2013 as Paris–Brussels) is a semi classic European bicycle race, one of the oldest races on the international calendar.

History
Paris–Brussels was first run on 12 August 1893 as an amateur event over a distance of 397 km, Belgian Andre Henry took the inaugural victory from compatriot Charles Delbecque with France's Fernand Augenault coming in third. The race did not return to the racing calendar until 1906 when it was run as a two-day event on 3 and 4 June. The first stage of this 1906 event was run from the Paris suburb of Villiers-sur-Marne to Reims over 152 km and was won by France's Maurice Bardonneau. Albert Dupont took the more challenging second stage on the following day from Reims to Brussels over 239 km to take the overall race victory from compatriots Jules Patou and Guillaume Coeckelberg. The following year the race reverted to being a one-day race and quickly established itself as one of the Spring Classics with a date towards the end of April, between Paris–Roubaix and Gent–Wevelgem. The event lost its prestige during the 1960s when the race was beset by traffic problems between the two capitals and the Dutch-promoted Amstel Gold Race took its place on the classics calendar. The race was not run between 1967 and 1972.

When the race returned in 1973 it was staged on a midweek date towards the end of September, just before Paris-Tours. The 1973 race was won by Eddy Merckx. In 1996 the race was switched from its midweek date back to being run on a Saturday. The most individual wins stood for a long time at three, by Octave Lapize (France) and Félix Sellier (Belgium). Lapize won in 1911, 1912 and 1913 and Sellier in 1922, 1923 and 1924. Lapize could have been a four-time winner but was disqualified after crossing the line first in the 1910 race when he and two other riders did not observe a mid race neutralised section, Maurice Brocco who crossed the line in fourth place was declared the eventual winner. In 2007, Robbie McEwen broke the record by winning his fourth race, and bettered this again with a fifth win in 2008.

In 2005 the race was set to change its name to the Grand Prix Eddy Merckx when an agreement was reached by the race organisers to amalgamate the two events. However, the deal fell through at the last minute and Paris–Brussels retained its name and the Grand Prix Eddy Merckx, a two rider time trial event, disappeared from the racing calendar.

In 2013 the race became the Brussels Cycling Classic and took place entirely in Belgium.

Memorable races and victories
Octave Lapize's second victory in 1912 had an element of good fortune about it, Lucien Petit-Breton and Cyrille van Hauwaert had broken away and the race looked certain to be decided between them when both riders were knocked off their bikes by a police horse allowing Lapize to overtake and claim victory. The 1921 race won by Frenchman Robert Reboul was made controversial by the fact that a group of riders chasing a 15-man breakaway (including Reboul) was sent down the wrong route by the race director. One of the riders sent the wrong way in that 1921 race was Felix Sellier who made up for that disappointment by triumphing in the next three editions of the race. His three victories were not without difficulties however, in 1922 he survived a fierce attack from a cloud of insects, in 1923 he had to catch a break that had gained a fifteen-minute advantage and in 1924 he suffered two punctures in the latter part of the race just as the vital break was forming.

The victory by Belgian Ernest Mottard in 1930 featured one of the great escapes in the history of the race, Mottard broke away from the peloton with  remaining and stayed away until the finish. Ireland's Shay Elliott was particularly unfortunate in 1958, he had a lead of over a minute with only three miles remaining when he smashed the frame of this bike with no team car near at hand, he was offered a touring bicycle by a spectator but was quickly caught by the chasing bunch and finished well down the field with Belgium's Rik Van Looy taking final victory. The 1963 edition of the race was made memorable by a small breakaway forming well before the border into Belgium, which was a rare event in itself. The break established a 13-minute lead and included Britain's Tom Simpson who was expected to win, being the best sprinter in the break, however his gears slipped in the final sprint and he lost out to France's Jean Stablinski.

The 1966 edition of Paris–Brussels was to be the last for seven years, as the race was beset by traffic problems to the route and a loss of prestige as the Amstel Gold Race took its place on the Spring Classics calendar. However, the 1966 race was made memorable by Italian Felice Gimondi who had won the 1965 Tour de France and seven days earlier had triumphed at Paris–Roubaix. Gimondi was the favourite for the race and a marked man, he lived up to his billing by breaking away with the help of teammate Dino Zandegu and winning the race in what was then a record time.  Marc Demeyer claimed a close victory from Roger De Vlaeminck and Roger Rosiers in 1974 in the town of Alsemberg which hosted the finish of the race between 1973 and 1980. Gimondi's record time lasted until 1975 when Freddy Maertens won the race in what was then a record average speed for a professional race and being awarded the Ruban Jaune for averaging 46.11 km per hour throughout the 285.5 km course. Felice Gimondi won again in 1976, ten years after his first victory, once more breaking away while the sprinters watched each other.

The 1983 race saw Sweden's Tommy Prim become the first Scandinavian rider to win a classic race. The 1994 race saw a breakaway by Sean Yates, Rolf Sørensen and Franco Ballerini, animosity existed between Yates and Sørensen after a shirt pulling incident in the Tour de France of that year, however, Sørensen dropped his breakaway companions and triumphed. The 1983 victory by Prim saw the start of the trend of the Paris–Brussels winner coming from more diverse nationalities from non traditional cycling nations with victories going to riders from Germany, Holland, Denmark, Latvia, Australia and Luxembourg in the ensuing years. 2010 saw the first victory in the race by a Spaniard when Francisco Ventoso took victory as the race finished in the Uccle municipality of Brussels for the first time.

Race length
Before 1926, the race was always over 400 km, with the longest versions being 440 km in 1913 and 1914. When the race returned after a break for the First World War in 1919 the race length was 417 km but this has reduced over the years with the 2010 edition being over a distance of 218 km, although as recently as 1987 the distance was 309 km when Wim Arras triumphed. The fastest edition of the race was 1975 when a tailwind helped Freddy Maertens finish with an average speed of 46.11 km/h.

Route
The race started at Soissons, in Picardy, 85 km north-east of Paris, although prior to 1996 the race started in Noyon and during the 1980s in Senlis. The race is level for much of its route and quite often there is a headwind against the riders. The last 25 km of the race are characterised by a series of cobbled climbs such as the Alsemberg, Mont Saint Roch and the Keperenberg and it is on these climbs that the winning break is often made. The race ended for many years in the Anderlecht district of Brussels outside the Constant Vanden Stock Stadium in the Place de Linde. However the 2005 edition saw a new finishing line at the Atomium north of the centre of Brussels.

The quality of field has suffered since the Vuelta a España moved to September in 1995, many sprinter-roadmen preferring the Spanish Tour.

Change to Brussels Classic
In June 2013 it was announced that the race would be renamed the Brussels classic and would take place entirely within Belgium. Starting at Cinquantenaire, the race now takes in 92 km within Walloon Brabant, 86 km in Flemish Brabant, and 23 km in the Brussels-Capital Region, for a total distance of 201 km. The race included eleven climbs including the double ascent of Vossemberg (twice), Smeysberg (twice) and the Langestraat (three times).

Results

Wins per country

References

 
Cycle races in France
Cycle races in Belgium
Classic cycle races
UCI Europe Tour races
Recurring sporting events established in 1893
1893 establishments in Belgium
1893 establishments in France
Challenge Desgrange-Colombo races
Super Prestige Pernod races